The Three Musketeers (Spanish:Los tres mosqueteros) is a 1946 Argentine-Uruguayan historical adventure film directed by Julio Saraceni and starring Armando Bo, Roberto Airaldi and Francisco Pablo Donadio. It is one of a number of film adaptations of Alexandre Dumas's 1844 novel The Three Musketeers. It was part of a growing trend for co-productions in Latin American filmmaking. Much of the film was shot in Montevideo.

Plot summary

Cast
 Armando Bo	as 	d'Artagnan
  Roberto Airaldi	as 	Athos
  Francisco Pablo Donadio	as 	Porthos
  Miguel Moya	as 	Richelieu
  Enrique Roldán as Rochefort
  César Fiaschi	as 	Rey
  Andrés Mejuto
  Inda Ledesma
  Pedro Becco		
  Augusto Codecá		
  Mario Nervi		
  Ramón Otero

References

Bibliography 
 Balderston, Daniel & Gonzalez, Mike & Lopez, Ana M. Encyclopedia of Contemporary Latin American and Caribbean Cultures. Routledge, 2014.

External links 
 

1946 films
Argentine historical adventure films
Uruguayan adventure films
Uruguayan historical films
Argentine black-and-white films
1940s historical adventure films
1940s Spanish-language films
Films directed by Julio Saraceni
Films set in the 1620s
Films set in France
Films set in Paris
Films shot in Montevideo
Films based on The Three Musketeers
Cultural depictions of Cardinal Richelieu
1940s Argentine films